The dun-bar (Cosmia trapezina) is a moth of the family Noctuidae. It is a common Palearctic species.

Distribution
The species occurs throughout almost the whole of Europe. In the north, the range extends to Middle Fennoscandia, in the east to the Urals. The species occurs in North Africa, Asia minor, Syria, Iraq, Iran, Caucasus, Central Asia to China, Korea and Japan (subspecies C. t. exigua (Butler, 1881)). It rises in the Alps up to 1600 m.

Description

This is a very variable species, both in size (wingspan 28–38 mm) and colour. The ground colour of the forewings varies from pale buff to dark or reddish brown with three narrow fascia. The area between the inner two fascia is sometimes much darker than the surrounding ground colour and is marked with stigmata, often quite indistinct. Melanic forms occasionally occur. The hindwings vary from pale cream to dingy brown. This moth flies at night from July to September  and is attracted to light and sugar and sometimes to nectar-rich flowers.

The larva is green with yellow lines and black and white spots. It feeds on a variety of plants, chiefly trees and shrubs (see list below) and also on the larvae of other Lepidoptera species, even occasionally its own species. The species overwinters as an egg.

  The flight season refers to the British Isles. This may vary in other parts of the range.

Recorded food plants

Acer – maple
Betula – birch
Corylus – hazel
Crataegus – hawthorn
Hippophae – sea-buckthorn
Lilium – lily
Malus – apple
Prunus
Pyrus – pear
Quercus – oak
Rhamnus – buckthorn
Rhododendron
Ribes – currant
Rubus – bramble
Salix – willow
Sorbus – rowan
Tilia – lime
Ulmus – wych elm

See.

References

 Chinery, Michael Collins Guide to the Insects of Britain and Western Europe 1986 (Reprinted 1991)
 Skinner, Bernard Colour Identification Guide to Moths of the British Isles 1984

External links

 Dun-bar on UKmohs
 Fauna Europaea
 Funet Taxonomy
 Lepiforum.de

Cosmia
Moths described in 1758
Moths of Africa
Moths of Asia
Moths of Europe
Moths of Japan
Taxa named by Carl Linnaeus